Vijith K. Malalgoda is a judge from Sri Lanka. He is a Puisne Justice of the Supreme Court of Sri Lanka and former President of the Court of Appeal of Sri Lanka.

Malalgoda studied at Dharmaraja College, Kandy.

References

Living people
Presidents of the Court of Appeal of Sri Lanka
Puisne Justices of the Supreme Court of Sri Lanka
Sinhalese judges
Year of birth missing (living people)
Alumni of Dharmaraja College